Gender variance or gender nonconformity is behavior or gender expression by an individual that does not match masculine or feminine gender norms. A gender-nonconforming person may be variant in their gender identity, being transgender or non-binary, or they may be cisgender. In the case of transgender people, they may be perceived, or perceive themselves as, gender-nonconforming before transitioning, but might not be perceived as such after transitioning. Transgender adults who appear gender-nonconforming after transition are more likely to experience transphobic discrimination.

Terminology

People who exhibit gender variance may be called gender-variant, gender-nonconforming, gender-diverse, or gender-atypical. The terms gender variance and gender-variant are used by scholars of psychology, psychiatry, anthropology, and gender studies, as well as advocacy groups of gender-variant people themselves. The term gender-variant is deliberately broad, encompassing such specific terms as transsexual, butch and femme, queen, sissy, tomboy, femboy, travesti, or hijra.

The word transgender usually has a narrower meaning and different connotations, including an identification that differs from the gender assigned at birth. GLAAD (formerly the Gay and Lesbian Alliance Against Defamation)'s Media Reference Guide defines transgender as an "umbrella term for people whose gender identity or gender expression differs from the sex they were assigned at birth." Not all gender-variant people identify as transgender, and not all transgender people identify as gender-variantmany identify simply as men or women. Gender identity is one's internal sense of their own gender; while most people have a gender identity of a boy or a man, or a girl or a woman, gender identity for other people is a more complex experience.

Furthermore, gender expression is the external manifestation of one's gender identity, usually through "masculine", "feminine", or gender-variant presentation or behavior.

Australian terminology

In Australia, the term gender-diverse or, historically, sex and/or gender-diverse, may be used in place of, or as well as, transgender. Culturally-specific gender diverse terms include sistergirls and brotherboys, for Aboriginal and Torres Strait Islander people. Ambiguities about the inclusion or exclusion of intersex people in terminology, such as sex and/or gender-diverse, led to a decline in use of the terms sex and/or gender-diverse and diverse sexes and genders (DSG). Current regulations providing for the recognition of trans and other gender identities use terms such as gender diverse and transgender. In July 2013, the Australian National LGBTI Health Alliance produced a guide entitled "Inclusive Language Guide: Respecting people of intersex, trans and gender diverse experience" which clearly distinguishes between different bodily and identity groups.

In childhood

Multiple studies have suggested a correlation between children who express gender nonconformity and their eventually coming out as gay, bisexual, or transgender. In multiple studies, a majority of those who identify as gay or lesbian self-report gender nonconformity as children. However, the accuracy of some of these studies have been questioned. The therapeutic community is currently divided on the proper response to childhood gender nonconformity.

One study suggested that childhood gender nonconformity is heritable. Studies have also been conducted about adults' attitudes towards nonconforming children. There are reportedly no significant generalized effects (with the exception of few outliers) on attitudes towards children who vary in gender traits, interests, and behavior.

Children who are gender-variant may struggle to conform later in life. As children get older and are not treated for the mismatch between their minds and bodily appearance, this leads to discomfort, and negative self-image and eventually may lead to depression, suicide, or self-doubt. If a child is nonconforming at a very young age, it is important to provide family support for positive impact to family and the child. Children who do not conform prior to age 11 tend to have an increased risk for depression, anxiety, and suicidal ideation as a young adult. A 2012 study found that both children who will be heterosexual and children who will have a minority sexual orientation who expressed gender nonconformity before the age of 11 were more likely to experience abuse physically, sexually, and psychologically.

Roberts et al. (2013) found that of participants in their study aged between 23 and 30, 26% of those who were gender nonconforming experienced some sort of depressive symptoms, versus 18% of those were gender-conforming. Treatment for gender identity disorders (GID; now known as gender dysphoria) such as gender variance have been a topic of controversy for three decades. In the works of Hill, Carfagnini and Willoughby (2007), Bryant (2004), "suggests that treatment protocols for these children and adolescents, especially those based on converting the child back to a stereotypically gendered youth, make matters worse, causing them to internalize their distress." Treatment for GID in children and adolescents may have negative consequences. Studies suggest that treatment should focus more on helping children and adolescents feel comfortable living with GID. There is a feeling of distress that overwhelms a child or adolescent with GID that gets expressed through gender. Hill et al. (2007) states, "if these youth are distressed by having a condition deemed by society as unwanted, is this evidence of a disorder?" Bartlett and colleagues (2000) note that the problem determining distress is aggravated in GID cases because usually, it is not clear whether distress in the child is due to gender variance or secondary effects (e.g., due to ostracization or stigmatization). Hill et al. (2007) suggests, "a less controversial approach, respectful of increasing gender freedom in our culture and sympathetic to a child's struggle with gender, would be more humane."

Social status for men vs. women
Gender nonconformity among people assigned male at birth is usually more strictly, and sometimes violently, policed in the West than is gender nonconformity among people assigned female at birth. However, a spectrum of types of gender nonconformity exists among boys and men. Some types of gender nonconformity, such as being a stay-at-home father, may pass without comment whereas others, such as wearing lipstick and skirts, may attract stares, criticism, or questioning. Some cultures are more tolerant than others of such differences.

This is a comparatively recent development in historical terms, because the dress and careers of women used to be more heavily policed, and still are in countries like Iran and Saudi Arabia (where they are regulated by law.)  The success of second-wave feminism is the chief reason for the freedom of women in the West to wear traditionally-male clothing such as trousers, or to take up traditionally-male occupations such as being a medical doctor, etc. At the other extreme, some Communist regimes such as the Soviet Union made a point of pushing women into traditionally male occupations in order to advance the feminist ideology of the statefor example, 58% of Soviet engineers were women in 1980but this trend went into reverse after the collapse of the Soviet Union.

Gender nonconforming transgender people in the United States have been demonstrated to have worse overall health outcomes than transgender individuals who identify as men or women.

Association with sexual orientation
Gender norms vary by country and by culture, as well as across historical time periods within cultures. For example, in Pashtun tribes in Afghanistan, adult men frequently hold hands, without being perceived as gay, whereas in the West this behavior would, in most circumstances, be seen as proof of a homosexual relationship. However, in many cultures, behaviors such as crying, an inclination toward caring for and nurturing others in an emotionally open way, an interest in domestic chores other than cooking, and self-grooming can all be seen as aspects of male gender nonconformity. Men who exhibit such tendencies are often stereotyped as gay. Studies found a high incidence of gay males self-reporting gender-atypical behaviors in childhood, such as having little interest in athletics and a preference for playing with dolls. The same study found that mothers of gay males recalled such atypical behavior in their sons with much greater frequency than mothers of heterosexual males.

For women, adult gender nonconformity is often associated with lesbianism due to the limited identities women are faced with at adulthood. Notions of heterosexual womanhood often require a rejection of physically demanding activities, social submission to a male figure (husband or boyfriend), an interest in reproduction and homemaking, and an interest in making oneself look more attractive for men with appropriate clothing, make-up, hairstyles and body shape.

Lesbian and bisexual women, being less concerned with attracting men, may find it easier to reject traditional ideas of womanhood because social punishment for such transgression is not effective, or at least no more effective than the consequences of being openly gay or bisexual in a heteronormative society (which they already experience). This may help account for high levels of gender nonconformity self-reported by lesbians.

Gender theorist Judith Butler, in her essay Performative Acts and Gender Constitution: An Essay in Phenomenology and Feminist Theory, states: "Discrete genders are part of what humanizes individuals within contemporary culture; indeed, those who fail to do their gender right are regularly punished. Because there is neither an 'essence' that gender expresses or externalizes nor an objective ideal to which gender aspires." Butler argues that gender is not an inherent aspect of identity, further stating, "...One might try to reconcile the gendered body as the legacy of sedimented acts rather than a predetermined or foreclosed structure, essence or fact, whether natural, cultural, or linguistic".

Research into nonbinary gender identities has found this:
The overwhelming majority of non-binary respondents ... identified as having a sexual minority sexual orientation, which is also consistent with findings from other research. This substantial overlap between non-binary gender and sexual minority status is intriguing and supports the conceptualization that "non-traditional" gender identities (i.e., outside the gender binary) and sexual orientation are distinct yet interrelated constructs.

Clothing

Among adults, the wearing of women's clothing by men is often socially stigmatized and fetishized, or viewed as sexually abnormal. However, cross-dressing may be a form of gender expression and is not necessarily related to erotic activity, nor is it indicative of sexual orientation. Other gender-nonconforming men prefer to simply modify and stylise men's clothing as an expression of their interest in appearance and fashion.

Gender-affirmative practices
Gender-affirmative practices recognize and support an individual's unique gender self-identification and expression. Gender-affirmative practices are becoming more widely adopted in the mental and physical health fields in response to research showing that clinical practices that encourage individuals to accept a certain gender identity can cause psychological harm. In 2015, the American Psychological Association published gender-affirmative practice guidelines for clinicians working with transgender and gender-nonconforming people. Preliminary research on gender-affirmative practices in the medical and psychological settings has primarily shown positive treatment outcomes. As these practices become more widely used, longer-term studies and studies with larger sample sizes are needed to continue to evaluate these practices.

Research has shown that youth who receive gender-affirming support from their parents have better mental health outcomes than their peers who do not.

Gender-affirmative practices emphasize gender health. Gender health is an individual's ability to identify as and express the gender(s) that feels most comfortable without fear of rejection. Gender-affirmative practices are informed by the following premises:

 gender variance is not a psychological disorder or mental illness
 gender expressions vary across cultures
 gender expressions are diverse and may not be binary
 gender development is affected by biological, developmental, and cultural factors
 if pathology occurs, it is more often from cultural reactions rather than from within the individual

Mental health practitioners have begun integrating the gender-affirmative model into cognitive behavioral therapy, person-centered therapy, and acceptance and commitment therapy. While taking different approaches, each therapeutic modality may prove beneficial to gender-variant people looking to self-actualize, cope with minority stress, or navigate personal, social, and occupational issues across their lifespan.

Atypical gender roles

Gender expectations, like other social norms, can vary widely by culture. A person may be seen as expressing an atypical gender role when their gender expression and activities differ from those usually expected in that culture. What is "typical" for one culture may be "atypical" for another. People from cultures who conceptualize gender as polar opposites on a binary, or having only two options, may see cultures with third gender people, or fluid gender expressions, and the people who live in these gender roles, as "atypical". 
Gender expressions that some cultures might consider "atypical" could include:

 Househusbands: men from patriarchal cultures who stay at home to raise children and take care of the home while their partner goes to work. National Public Radio reported that by 2015 this had risen to around 12.6% of heterosexual marriages. This would only be "atypical" in a culture where it is the norm for women to stay home.
 Androgynous people: having a gender presentation that is either mixed or neutral in a culture that prizes polarised (binary) presentations.
 Crossdresser: a person who dresses in the clothing of, and otherwise assumes, "the appearance, manner, or roles traditionally associated with members of the opposite sex". Crossdressers may be cisgender, or they may be trans people who have only socially transitioned without further medical intervention.
 Femminiello: a population of people who embody a third gender role in traditional Neapolitan culture (southern Italy).
 Hijra: a traditional third-gender person who is occasionally intersex, but most often considered male at birth. Many of the Hijra are eunuchs who have chosen to be ritually castrated in a dedication ceremony. They have a ceremonial role in several traditional South Asian cultures, often performing naming ceremonies and blessings. They dress in what is considered "women's" garments for that culture, but are seen as neither men nor women, but hijra. 
 Khanith: an effeminate gay male in Omani culture who is allowed to associate with women. The clothing of these individuals must be intermediate between that of a male and a female.
 Two-spirit: a modern, pan-Indian, umbrella term used by some Indigenous North Americans to describe Native people in their communities who fulfill a traditional third-gender (or other gender-variant) social and ceremonial role in their cultures. The term two-spirit was created in 1990 at the Indigenous lesbian and gay international gathering in Winnipeg, and "specifically chosen to distinguish and distance Native American/First Nations people from non-Native peoples."
 Male spirit mediums in Myanmar: Biological men that are spirit mediums (nat kadaw) wear women's attire and wear makeup during religious ceremonies. The majority of male spirit mediums live their lives permanently as women.

See also

 Discrimination against non-binary gender people
 Effeminacy
 Gender bender
 Gender binary
 Gender diversity
 Gender dysphoria
 Gender polarization
 Gender policing
 Masculinity
 Queer heterosexuality
 Third gender
 Transphobia

References

Further reading

External links

 
Androgyny
Nonconformity
Nonconformity
Transgender